Mónika Kovacsicz (formerly Monika Kovačičová; born 20 November 1983) is a retired Hungarian handballer of Slovak descent.

Her first major international tournament was the 2005 World Championship, where she finished third with the Hungarian team. She was at another World Championship (2007) and took part in three European Championships (2006, 2008, 2010). She also competed at the 2008 Summer Olympics in Beijing, capturing a fourth place.

Kovacsicz won the Champions League with Viborg in 2009.

Achievements
Nemzeti Bajnokág I:
Winner: 2005, 2006, 2015
Silver Medalist: 2004, 2007, 2012, 2013, 2014, 2016
Bronze Medalist: 2008, 2011
Nemzeti Bajnokság I/B:
Winner: 2018
Magyar Kupa:
Winner: 2005, 2006, 2007
Damehåndboldligaen:
Winner: 2009
Landspokalturnering:
Winner: 2008
EHF Champions League:
Winner: 2009, 2010
EHF Cup:
Finalist: 2004, 2005
EHF Cup Winners' Cup:
Winner: 2011, 2012
Finalist: 2006
World Championship:
Bronze Medalist: 2005
European Championship:
Bronze Medalist: 2012

Individual awards
 EHF Cup Winners' Cup Top Scorer: 2012

Personal life
Her cousin, Szandra Zácsik, is a professional handball player and a Hungarian international.

References

External links

Profile on Ferencvárosi TC Official Website
Career statistics at Worldhandball

1983 births
Living people
Sportspeople from Komárno
Hungarian female handball players
Hungarian people of Serbian descent
Olympic handball players of Hungary
Handball players at the 2008 Summer Olympics
Győri Audi ETO KC players
Békéscsabai Előre NKSE players
Expatriate handball players
Hungarian expatriates in Denmark
Viborg HK players
Ferencvárosi TC players (women's handball)